Saint Henry is an unincorporated community in Cass Township, Dubois County, in the U.S. state of Indiana.

History
Saint Henry was platted about 1874. The town was originally called Henryville, but was changed to Saint Henry because there was already a Henryville in Indiana.

A post office was established at Saint Henry in 1870, and remained in operation until it was discontinued in 1933.

Geography

References

Unincorporated communities in Dubois County, Indiana
Unincorporated communities in Indiana
Jasper, Indiana micropolitan area